The 2000 European Judo Championships were the 11th edition of the European Judo Championships, and were held at Hala Ludowa – People's Hall in Wrocław, Poland from 20 May to 21 May 2000.

Medal overview

Men

Women

Medals table

Results overview

Men

60 kg

66 kg

73 kg

81 kg

90 kg

100 kg

+100 kg

Open class

Women

48 kg

52 kg

57 kg

63 kg

70 kg

78 kg

+78 kg

Open class

References

External links
 

 
E
Judo Championships
European Judo Championships
Judo 2000
Sport in Wrocław
Judo competitions in Poland